Svenska Cupen or Swedish Cup may refer to

 Svenska Cupen (association football)
 Svenska Cupen (women) (association football)
 Svenska Cupen (bandy)
 Copa Suecia (association football, Argentina 1958–1960)